{{Infobox person
| name        = Natalie McQueen
| image       =
| caption     = 
| birth_name  = 
| birth_date  = 
| birth_place = Essex, England
| death_date  = 
| death_place = 
| nationality = British
| other_names = 
| occupation  = Actress, singer,
| known_for   = Wicked, Kinky Boots, 9 to 5| spouse      = 
| website     = 
}}

Natalie McQueen (born 1 June 1989) is an English actress known for her performances in a number of UK West End productions including Bonnie & Clyde, 9 to 5, Kinky Boots and Wicked.

She was named as one of the ten theatre faces to look out for in 2017 after her performance in a one-night-only concert entitled An evening with Frank Wildhorn and friends in Manchester.Shenton, Mark. "Laura Osnes and Jackie Burns to Appear with Frank Wildhorn in Manchester Concert" Playbill, 18 Oct 2016, accessed 21 Sep 2018 

In September 2018, it was announced that McQueen would play the leading role of Doralee Rhodes in the first West End run of Broadway musical 9 to 5, a character originally played by Dolly Parton in the 1980s film of the same name.

Early life

McQueen was born in Dagenham, Essex. She trained at CPA school and subsequently CPA studios, both part of Colin's Performing Arts Group founded by principal Colin Putz, alongside  James Buckley, Jessie J, The Loveable Rogues, Anne Marie, Rochelle Humes, Frankie Bridge and Jack Shalloo.

Career
McQueen made her professional theatre debut at the age of 8, playing Young Eponine in Les Misérables, at the Palace Theatre, London. This was followed the role of Eva in the original London cast of Chitty Chitty Bang Bang at the London Palladium.

In 2013, McQueen was one of the five UK industry jury members for the Eurovision Song Contest alongside Tony Blackburn and Scott Mills.

In the same year, she joined the cast of Wicked at the Apollo Theatre in London. She performed a variety of roles up until 2016, including Elphaba and Nessarose. She also performed Elphaba's songs on behalf of Wicked at the West End Live Launches in 2015 and 2016, and at The Annual Wicked Young Writers Awards.

In 2015 and whilst still in Wicked, McQueen played Chrissie Starr in the workshop Becoming Nancy, directed by Jerry Mitchell and based on the book by Terry Ronald. The following year, McQueen was cast as the alternate to the leading role of Sara played by Kerry Ellis in Murder Ballad, in a cast that also included Ramin Karimloo, Victoria Hamilton-Barritt  and Norman Bowman.

In 2017 McQueen was cast as the Mad Hatter in the European premiere of Frank Wildhorn’s Wonderland alongside Kerry Ellis, Wendi Peters and Dave Willetts. The show opened at the Edinburgh Playhouse and went on to tour the UK.

In 2017 she played Dinah in the rework of Andrew Lloyd Webber's Starlight Express at The Other Palace.

In April 2018, it was announced that McQueen would be taking over the role of Lauren in a new casting line-up for the West End production of Cyndi Lauper and Harvey Fierstein’s Kinky Boots, alongside Oliver Tompsett, Sean Needham and Simon-Anthony Rhoden, at the Adelphi Theatre in London’s West End.Wolff, Emerson ”Former Dagenham schoolgirl to star in West End musical Kinky Boots” Barking and Dagenham Post, 4 Jun 2018, accessed 21 Sep 2018  McQueen’s first performance was on 4 June 2018. The run of the show concluded on 12 January 2019.Hewis, Ben. “My Top 5 Showtunes: Natalie McQueen” Whats On Stage, 14 Jul 2018, accessed 21 Sep 2018 

In January 2019, McQueen began playing the role of Doralee Rhodes in the West End production of 9 To 5: The Musical at the Savoy Theatre in London. The show is due to run until August 31.Wolf, Matt. "Natalie McQueen on Bringing 9 to 5 to the West End in the #MeToo Era and Her Dream Trip to Dollywood" Broadway, 6 Feb 2019, accessed 13 Feb 2019  McQueen received positive reviews for her performance.Maxwell, Dominic. "Review: 9 to 5 the Musical, Savoy Theatre, WC2." The Times, 18 Feb 2019, accessed 25 Feb 2019. 

In 2021 Natalie was announced to play Catherine in Pippin in London.

In 2022, Natalie played Blanche Barrow in Bonnie and Clyde in Concert Bonnie & Clyde'' at the Theatre Royal, Drury Lane. Broadway's Jeremy Jordan played Clyde Barrow with Frances Mayli McCann as Bonnie. It was later announced that McQueen would play the role as part of the original West End cast of Bonnie & Clyde, which is set to premiere at the Arts Theatre in April 2022.

Theatre credits

References

External links

Natalie McQueen on Broadway World

Living people
English stage actresses
English musical theatre actresses
English female dancers
1989 births